Lissospira ornata is a species of sea snail, a marine gastropod mollusk in the family Skeneidae.

Description
The diameter of the shell attains 2.6 mm. This species agrees in form and condition of the umbilical region with the Lissospira dalli. But it is very peculiarly marked on the base by thin, impressed lines, running obliquely and crossing the concentric spiral lines at a large angle, so as to produce a sort of "herring-bone" pattern as shown in the figure.

Distribution
This species occurs in the Atlantic Ocean off North Carolina, USA, at a depth of 1542 m.

References

 Verrill, A. E. 1884. Second catalogue of Mollusca recently added to the fauna of the New England coast and the adjacent parts of the Atlantic, consisting mostly of deep-sea species, with notes on others previously recorded. Transactions of the Connecticut Academy of Arts and Sciences 6: 139-294, pls. 28-32.

External links
 To Encyclopedia of Life
 To World Register of Marine Species

ornata
Gastropods described in 1884